The genus Chrysotoxum  (Meigen, 1803)  consists of  large, wasp-mimicking species. The adults are distinguished by very long antennae, oval abdomen with yellow stripes, and yellow patterns on the thoracic pleurae (sides of the thorax).
The species of Chrysotoxum are chiefly Holarctic in distribution.
. The species in this genus, are mostly very uniform in structure and colour and are separated with  difficulty. 
Larvae are specialized in preying upon root aphids associated with ant nests .

Taxonomy
Chrysotoxum is the only genus in the tribe Chrysotoxini 
Features common to this genus are:
The head  is slightly wider than the thorax. The eyes are more or less pubescent  and are contiguous (contacting each other medially} in males and widely separated in females. They have a prominent or angular frons and antennae base, features best seen in profile.  The face is slightly concave.  The antennae are long and erect, inserted on the frontal angle, with the first two segments nearly equal, and the third one (flagellum) is  three to six times longer than the previous ones. Abdomen strongly convex dorsally, very deeply margined. Abdomen strongly convex dorsally, very deeply margined. The wings have the median transverse vein located before the middle of the discal cell. The wing vein R4+5 clearly dipped into cell r4+5. 

There are many Chrysotoxum taxonomy concerns yet to be resolved due to the few morphological features available for species characterisation. Characters frequently used: the color of legs, the overall size, the connections between the various abdominal stripes and spots have been found to vary considerably within a species  Differences in  male terminalia, often of great diagnostic value in other genera are, so far, unhelpful among the majority of Chrysotoxum species.

Species

C. amurense Violovitsh, 1973
C. arcuatum (Linnaeus, 1758)
C. asiaticum Becker, 1921
C. bactrianum Violovitsh, 1973
C. bajkalicum Violovitsh, 1973
C. baphyrum  Walker, 1849 
C. bicinctum (Linnaeus, 1758)
C. caucasicum Sack, 1930
C. cautum (Harris, 1776)
C. chakassicum Violovitsh, 1975
C. chinook Shannon, 1926
C. cisalpinum Rondani, 1845
C. continum  Bezzi, 1915 
C. coreanum Shiraki, 1930
C. derivatum Walker, 1849
C. elegans Loew, 1841
C. fasciatum (Müller, 1764)
C. fasciolatum (De Geer, 1776)
C. festivum (Linnaeus, 1758)
C. flaveolum Violovitsh, 1973
C. flavifrons Macquart, 1842
C. fratellum Shannon, 1926
C. gracile Becker, 1921
C. graciosum Violovitsh, 1975
C. grande Matsumura, 1911
C. hameleon Violovitsh, 1973
C. impressum Becker, 1921
C. integrum  
C. intermedium Meigen, 1822
C. kozhevnikovi Smirnov, 1925
C. kozlovi Violovitsh, 1973
C. lanulosum Violovitsh, 1973
C. laterale Loew, 1864
C. latifasciatum Becker, 1921
C. lessonae Giglio-Tos, 1890
C. lineare (Zetterstedt, 1819)
C. lydiae Violovitsh, 1964
C. montivagum Violovitsh, 1973
C. octomaculatum Curtis, 1837
C. parmense Rondani, 1845
C. parvulum Violovitsh, 1973
C. perplexum Johnson, 1924
C. przewalskyi Portschinsky, 1887
C. pubescens Loew, 1864
C. radha Violovitsh, 1971
C. radiosum Shannon, 1926
C. ramphostoma  Mutin, 1999 
C. rhodopense Drensky, 1934
C. robustum Portschinsky, 1887
C. rossicum Becker, 1921
C. rubzovi Violovitsh, 1973
C. sackeni Giglio-Tos, 1890
C. sapporense Matsumura, 1916
C. sibiricum Loew, 1856
C. skufjini Violovitsh, 1973
C. stackelbergi Violovitsh, 1953
C. stenolomum Violovitsh, 1973
C. subbicinctum Violovitsh, 1956
C. testaceum Sack, 1913
C. triarcuatum Macquart in Webb & Berthelot, 1839
C. verae Violovitsh, 1973
C. vernale Loew, 1841
C. verralli Collin, 1940
C. villosulum Bigot, 1883
C. willistoni Curran, 1924
C. ypsilon Williston, 1887

References

Hoverfly genera
Syrphinae
Taxa named by Johann Wilhelm Meigen